Péter Tóth (born 10 April 2001) is a Hungarian footballer who plays as a midfielder for Honvéd.

Career statistics

Club

Notes

References

2001 births
Living people
Hungarian footballers
Association football midfielders
Budapest Honvéd FC players
FC Ajka players
Békéscsaba 1912 Előre footballers
Nemzeti Bajnokság I players
Nemzeti Bajnokság II players